Robert Charles "Chic" Breese (21 March 1872 – 20 May 1929) was a former Australian rules footballer who played with Carlton in the Victorian Football League (VFL).

Notes

External links 
		

Chic Breese's profile at Blueseum

1872 births
Australian rules footballers from Melbourne
Carlton Football Club players
Essendon Association Football Club players
1929 deaths
People from Brunswick, Victoria